Blood, Fire & Love is the first studio album by Scottish rock band The Almighty, released in 1989. A three-disc deluxe edition was released by Spinefarm Records in 2015, including the Blood, Fire & Live album on the second disc, and all of the B-sides from the various singles on disc three.

Track listing 

 "Resurrection Mutha" – 4:56
 "Destroyed" – 3:43
 "Wild & Wonderful" – 4:58
 "Blood, Fire & Love" – 5:46
 "Gift Horse" – 3:38
 "You've Gone Wild" – 3:59
 "Lay Down the Law" – 4:01
 "Power" – 3:58
 "Full Force Lovin' Machine" – 3:45
 "Detroit" – 3:23
 "New Love Sensation" – 3:03

2014 deluxe edition disc 2: Blood, Fire & Live 

 "Full Force Lovin' Machine"
 "You've Gone Wild"
 "Lay Down the Law"
 "Blood, Fire & Love"
 "Destroyed"
 "Wild & Wonderful"
 "Resurrection Mutha"
 "You Ain't Seen Nothin' Yet"

2014 deluxe edition disc 3: Bonus tracks 

 "Destroyed (Demo)"
 "Lay Down the Law (Demo)"
 "Full Force Lovin' Machine (Demo)"
 "Destroyed (Radio Version)"
 "Love Me to Death"
 "Blood, Fire & Love (Metal Version)"
 "Wild & Wonderful (Live)"
 "Lay Down the Law (Live)"
 "Power (Killer Watt Mix)"
 "Power (Live)"
 "Power (Dub Mix)"
 "Thunderbird"
 "Good God Almighty"
 "Power (Friday Night Rock Show)"
 "Wild & Wonderful (Friday Night Rock Show)"
 "Destroyed (Friday Night Rock Show)"
 "Thunderbird (Friday Night Rock Show)"

Personnel 
The Almighty
 Ricky Warwick – lead vocals, rhythm and acoustic guitars
 Tantrum – lead and rhythm guitars, backing vocals
 Stump Munroe – drums, backing vocals, percussion
 Floyd London – bass, backing vocals, acoustic guitar

Guest musicians

 James Taylor – Hammond organ on "Wild & Wonderful" and "Detroit", piano on "Blood, Fire & Love"
 Adam Peters – organ on "Resurrection Mutha"
 Anne Dudley – string arrangement on "Blood, Fire & Love"

References 

1989 albums
The Almighty (band) albums
Polydor Records albums